The 1999–2000 Real Betis season was the club's 93rd season in existence and its sixth consecutive season in the top flight of Spanish football. In addition to the domestic league, Real Betis participated in this season's edition of the Copa del Rey. The season covered the period from 1 July 1999 to 30 June 2000.

Betis finished in the 18th place to return to the second division after six years.

Pre-season and friendlies

Real Betis played one pre-season match against Celta, which ended in a 2–1 loss.

Competitions

Overview

La Liga

League table

Results summary

Results by round

Matches

Source:

Copa del Rey

First round

Second round

References

External links

Real Betis seasons
Real Betis